Peter Uihlein (born August 29, 1989) is an American professional golfer who formerly played on the PGA Tour and the European Tour and now plays in the LIV Golf League. He was a member of the victorious U.S. team at the 2009 Walker Cup, where he compiled a 4–0 match record. Uihlein won the 2010 U.S. Amateur and is a former number one ranked amateur golfer in the world.

Amateur career
Uihlein was born in New Bedford, Massachusetts to Wally and Tina Uihlein, and grew up in Mattapoisett. Wally Uihlein is the retired chairman and chief executive officer of the Acushnet Company, a golf equipment manufacturer which comprises Titleist and other brands. At age 13, Uihlein moved to Bradenton, Florida to attend the David Leadbetter Golf program, part of IMG Academy's Pendleton School. He was named Player of the Year by the American Junior Golf Association (AJGA) in 2005 and again in 2007, becoming the fifth boy in the award's history to win more than once, joining a list that includes Phil Mickelson and Tiger Woods. Uihlein was featured in a 2006 Sports Illustrated article spotlighting then-teenage athletes including Tyreke Evans, A. J. Green and John Tavares.
 
In 2007, Uihlein won the Terra Cotta Invitational. In 2008, Uihlein chose to attend Oklahoma State University, where he struggled with his game for a long stretch during his freshman year. Nonetheless, he was named to the 2009 Walker Cup team and posted a 4–0 record for the victorious U.S. squad. He won the Dixie Amateur in December and became the world's number one ranked amateur golfer in May 2010. After runner-up finishes at the Big 12 Championship and the NCAA Division I Men's Golf Championships, Uihlein won the Sahalee Players Championship by seven strokes.

On his 21st birthday, Uihlein defeated David Chung 4 & 2 in the 36-hole final of the U.S. Amateur at Chambers Bay in University Place, Washington. Uihlein became the fourth Oklahoma State player to win the event, and first since Scott Verplank in 1984. In September, Uihlein won the Mark H. McCormack Medal for being on top of the World Amateur Golf Ranking at the end of the amateur season, following the European Amateur and U.S. Amateur events.

During his junior year, Uihlein won the Ben Hogan Award, given to the best college golfer in the nation. He was also named a first team All-American. Uihlein tried unsuccessfully to defend his U.S. Amateur title in 2011 when he lost in the quarterfinals. He played the European and PGA Tour qualifying schools in 2011, but failed to earn tour cards on either tour. He decided to turn professional in December 2011.

Professional career
Uihlein finished in a tie for 12th at his first professional event on the Challenge Tour at the 2012 Gujarat Kensville Challenge. Uihlein has also played on the Sunshine Tour, where he finished T4 at the 2013 Tshwane Open, an event co-sanctioned with the European Tour. Uihlein earned his first professional win in 2013 at the Madeira Islands Open, a dual-ranked event on the European Tour and Challenge Tour. He ranked 14th in the 2013 Race to Dubai money list with eight top-10 finishes, and was named the European Tour's Sir Henry Cotton Rookie of the Year.

In 2017, Uihlein played the Puerto Rico Open on the PGA Tour via a sponsor's exemption and finished fifth. A week later, he finished 23rd at the Shell Houston Open. These earned him enough FedEx Cup points for a place in the 2017 Web.com Tour Finals. He won the first tournament to earn a place on the PGA Tour for 2017–18.

Uihlein played 26 events on the 2017–18 PGA Tour, making the cut 16 times. He had eight top-25 finishes, four top-10 finishes, and three top-five finishes. In round three of the Wells Fargo Championship, he had a birdie/eagle streak of 7-under on six holes, which tied him with Jonathan Randolph for the longest streak on the PGA Tour for the 2017–18 PGA season. He finished at number 64 in the FedEx Cup standings, qualifying him for the FedEx Cup playoffs in his rookie season, winning $1.8 million for the season.

During the 2018–19 season, Uihlein played a total of 29 events on the PGA Tour. His best results were a T7 at the RSM Classic in November 2018, and a T5 in May 2019 at the AT&T Byron Nelson tournament. He won $840,000 during the season, finishing at number 133 in the FedEx Cup standings.

In 2021, Uihlein won his second Korn Ferry Tour event at the MGM Resorts Championship.  He would go on to earn his PGA Tour card for 2022 with a Top 25 finish in the Korn Ferry Tour Finals.

On June 9, 2022, Uihlein was one of 17 PGA Tour members suspended for playing in the Saudi-backed LIV Golf.

Amateur wins
2006 St. Augustine Amateur
2007 Terra Cotta Invitational
2009 Dixie Amateur
2010 Sahalee Players Championship, U.S. Amateur, Dixie Amateur
2011 Northeast Amateur

Professional wins (3)

European Tour wins (1)

1Dual-ranking event with the Challenge Tour

European Tour playoff record (0–1)

Korn Ferry Tour wins (2)

Korn Ferry Tour playoff record (0–1)

Challenge Tour wins (1)

1Dual-ranking event with the European Tour

Playoff record
LIV Golf Invitational Series playoff record (0–1)

Results in major championships

CUT = missed the half-way cut
"T" = tied for place

Summary

Most consecutive cuts made – 1 (three times)
Longest streak of top-10s – 0

Results in The Players Championship

CUT = missed the halfway cut

Results in World Golf Championships
Results not in chronological order before 2015.

QF, R16, R32, R64 = Round in which player lost in match play
"T" = tied

U.S. national team appearances
Walker Cup:  2009 (winners), 2011
Eisenhower Trophy: 2010

See also
2017 Web.com Tour Finals graduates
2021 Korn Ferry Tour Finals graduates

References

External links

Profile on Oklahoma State's official athletic site

American male golfers
Oklahoma State Cowboys golfers
European Tour golfers
PGA Tour golfers
LIV Golf players
Korn Ferry Tour graduates
Golfers from Massachusetts
Golfers from Orlando, Florida
Sportspeople from Plymouth County, Massachusetts
Sportspeople from New Bedford, Massachusetts
People from Mattapoisett, Massachusetts
1989 births
Living people